Saptharishishwarar Temple is a Hindu temple dedicated to the deity Shiva, located at Lalgudi in Tiruchirapalli district, Tamil Nadu, India.

Vaippu Sthalam
It is one of the shrines of the Vaippu Sthalams sung by Tamil Saivite Nayanar Appar. This place is also known as Thavathurai. In Thandakam this place is mentioned as Eluvar Thavathurai. As per Hindu legend, the seven stars or the Saptarishi are believed to have worshipped the presiding deity of the temple after which the temple came to be known as Saptharishishwarar.

Presiding deity
The presiding deity in the garbhagriha, represented by the lingam, is known as Saptharishishwarar. The Goddess is known as Mahasampath Gowri and Periyanayaki. The lingam is having some cracks on it.

Specialities
Shiva sculpture is found with Khaṭvāṅga in this temple, Ekambaranathar Temple and Valisvarar Temple.  The Saptarishi such as Vasishtha, Atri, Bhrigu, Pulathiyar, Gowthamar, Angirasa and Marichi worshipped the presiding deity of the temple. Their sculptures are found in this temple. This place is also sung in Thiruppugazh. Inscriptions with Thiruppugazh songs are found, next to the shrine of Vinayaka. Tyagaraja came here and sung five kirtanas. They are found in the inscriptions. Paraitthurai, Thenpalaithurai, Thavathurai, Mayiladuthurai, Kadambandurai, and Avaduthurai are the places where Shiva is residing and should be worshipped by one and all. Among them this place is also found.

Festivals
Sivarathri, Karthikai and Margazhi Tiruvathirai are held in this temple.

Location
The temple is located at Lalgudi, very near to Trichy. After crossing the railway line in Lalgudi in the bus route, the temple can be reached at a distance of 2 k.m.  It is opened for worship from 6.00 to 11.30 a.m. and 4.00 to 9.00 p.m.

References

Hindu temples in Tiruchirappalli district
Shiva temples in Tiruchirappalli district